"Frobisher Bay," also known as "Frozen in Frobisher Bay," is a song by James Gordon about whaling in the Canadian Arctic. It has been recorded by many artists in Canada and the United States and was used as an audition song on Canadian Idol.

Discography
Tamarack  Frobisher Bay 1993
Tamarack Blankets of Snow 1998
James Gordon Mining for Gold
Hilary Spencer Afterimage 2001
Bach Children's Chorus (of Toronto) Go Where You Will

References

James Gordon (Canadian musician) songs
Year of song missing